Salem Hospital is a non-profit, regional medical center located in Salem, Oregon, United States. Founded in 1896, the hospital has 454 beds. A Level II trauma center, the community hospital is the largest private employer in Salem and the only hospital in the city. Salem Hospital is one of five Magnet designated hospitals in Oregon.

History
In 1896, Salem General Hospital was incorporated at the Glen Oak Orphanage. The original building for Salem General burned in 1920, with a new building completed the following year. Salem General expanded in 1926 and 1953.

In 1916, Frank B. Wedel and his wife started the Deaconess Home and Hospital in a former hotel on Winter Street. Started with four nurses, the hospital grew and was expanded in 1920, becoming Deaconess Hospital. The hospital was expanded again in 1924 to 1925, with administration staying in the Wedel family home until it was converted into a community hospital and renamed as Salem Memorial Hospital. In 1969, Salem Memorial Hospital and Salem General Hospital merged to create Salem Hospital.

Salem Hospital purchased Valley Community Hospital (now known as West Valley Hospital) in neighboring Dallas in 1999. In 2001, the hospital finalized plans to expand and replace the 1950s building. As part of this program, a new emergency room was completed in December 2003. In 1999, the hospital was downgraded from a Level II to a Level III trauma center by the State of Oregon. Beginning in 2001, the hospital was allowed to treat some Level II patients that would normally be transferred to another hospital under the state's four tier trauma care rating system.

In 2003, a new five-story building was added to house infant, child, and pregnancy services. In October 2006, construction on a new seven-story,  building began. Completed in May 2009, the $219 million tower replaced approximately half of the existing hospital beds and include three skybridges to the other buildings at the hospital campus.

Salem Hospital received five-star ratings from HealthGrades in 2007 for cholecystectomy, total-hip replacement, back and neck surgery, coronary bypass surgery, gastrointestinal surgery, coronary interventional procedures, treatment of heart attack, and spinal surgery, as well as an award for cardiac and gastrointestinal surgeries. The hospital's laboratory became accredited in 2007 by the College of American Pathologists' Laboratory Accreditation Program Accreditation Committee. In 2008, the hospital added the da Vinci System, a robotic surgery system, with a grant from the Salem Hospital Foundation. Salem Hospital was elevated to a Level II trauma center from Level III in December 2010.

Salem Hospital Heliport
The Salem Hospital Heliport  is a private heliport located on the hospital's Patient Care Tower (Building A). The previous helipad was eliminated when the parking structure that it resided upon was torn down in 2006 to make way for the construction. During the interim period helicopters landed in the Willamette University's McCulloch Stadium located in Bush's Pasture Park south of the hospital.

Details

Salem Hospital contains 454 hospital beds and serves an area of 350,000 people. Thirty-five beds are skilled care patient beds while the remaining 419 are acute care beds. Service is provided to a three-county area that includes Marion, Yamhill, and Polk counties. The hospital is Salem's largest private employer with 5,200 employees. Admissions totaled 25,147 as of 2001 with 115,487 emergency or urgent care patients in 2019. In 2019, 14,658 surgeries were performed and 3,306 babies delivered at the hospital. 

Facilities at the hospital include one of a few psychiatric regional care centers in Oregon. Designed to replace the services of the state hospital system, the Salem facility has a 24-bed unit. The emergency department includes nearly 60 beds, and is the busiest on the west coast between Los Angeles and the Canadian border, with an average of 316 patients treated each day. Other services include a cancer center, a surgery center, imaging, and a center for sleep disorders.

In 2020, the hospital began a large 150-bed expansion to the Patient Care Tower. The building resides over the previous footprint of the emergency department parking lot, and once completed will be a seamless expansion of Building A.

Management is performed by the board of trustees, a fifteen-member volunteer group. The hospital also operates a rehabilitation center, an urgent care center, an MRI facility, and an outpatient center. The Oregon Department of Human Services has designated the hospital as a Level II trauma center.

Salem Hospital was originally granted Magnet status in 2010, received recertification in July 2015, and is currently 1 of 5 Oregon hospitals with this status.

References

External links

Hospitals in Oregon
Hospital buildings completed in 1921
Hospital buildings completed in 1925
Hospitals established in 1896
Buildings and structures in Salem, Oregon
1896 establishments in Oregon